The 1973–74 Illinois Fighting Illini men's basketball team represented the University of Illinois.

Regular season

The 1973-74 Fighting Illini men's basketball team had done something that no other Illinois team in history had accomplished, finishing last in the Big Ten, tenth place.  In the history of the school, Illinois has only had one worse finish, the 1998-99 season, where they ended the year in eleventh place. However, the 1998-99 team played for the Big Ten tournament championship, losing to Michigan State in the championship game.
  
The 1973-74 season also witnessed the conclusion of a very difficult tenure at the position of head coach. Harv Schmidt, a former player turned head coach, finished his seventh season at Illinois with an overall record of 89 wins and 77 losses. Unfortunately for Schmidt, several situations contributed to his demise, most of the problems being not of his doing. He was a disciplinarian and demanded attention to detail.  He worked his players hard yet he was fair and considerate of their needs. Schmidt had high expectations from his team and set a good example by working as hard as he expected his players to work.

Roster

Source

Schedule
																																																
Source																																																																																																
																																																
|-																																																
!colspan=12 style="background:#DF4E38; color:white;"| Non-Conference regular season
	
	
	
	
	
	

|-
!colspan=9 style="background:#DF4E38; color:#FFFFFF;"|Big Ten regular season

	
		

	

	
|-

Player stats

Awards and honors
Rick Schmidt
Team Most Valuable Player

Team players drafted into the NBA

Rankings

References

Illinois Fighting Illini
Illinois Fighting Illini men's basketball seasons
1973 in sports in Illinois
1974 in sports in Illinois